Hercules and Xena – The Animated Movie: The Battle for Mount Olympus is a 1998 American animated action-adventure direct-to-video film starring the voices of Kevin Sorbo, Lucy Lawless, Michael Hurst, Renee O'Connor, Kevin Smith, and Alexandra Tydings, all reprising their roles from the two live-action/special effects television series, Hercules: The Legendary Journeys and Xena: Warrior Princess. In the film, Zeus' wife Hera releases the four Titans after eons of imprisonment in a fit of jealousy, prompting Hercules and Xena to join forces and stop her. The film was produced and directed by Lynne Naylor and written by John Loy. It later received a television airing on Fox's Fox Kids block.

Plot
Long after Zeus stole the Cronus Stone from the Titans, he and Alcmene gave birth to a son named Hercules, who defeated a Hydra at an early age and became a hero. After Hercules battles a sea serpent and defeats it and is thanked by the local townspeople, Iolaus joins him. Hercules and Iolaus head to Thebes to see Alcmene, but Iolaus is upset because Hercules takes the credit. Meanwhile, Xena and Gabrielle steal the gold back from a trio satyrs to return to Corinth. Ares appears and tells Xena there is a trap set for Hercules at Thebes. Xena wants Hercules to go because Thebes needs his help. Xena, angered by Ares' intentions to take her as his wife, argues with Gabrielle.

Hercules and Iolaus are working the fields at Alcmene's farm when Zeus descends to abduct Alcmene to take her to Mount Olympus, despite Hercules' attempts to stop him. Angered, Iolaus and Hercules decide to rescue her. Ares reveals to Zeus that he wants Xena and had tried to get her help to stop Hercules before he witnessed Zeus take Alcmene. Hera confronts Zeus before stealing the Cronus Stone, the stone that keeps the Titans in the Underworld lava pits. Hera summons the Titans out while Zeus checks on Alcmene, who has been shrunk and placed in a dollhouse castle for safety from Hera. Meanwhile, Aphrodite surfs down a mountain to Iolaus' happiness. Ignoring Aphrodite's warning, Hercules decides to go to Mount Olympus to rescue Alcmene and Iolaus stays behind with Aphrodite. A boy falls into the lava pits, but is saved by Hercules and Iolaus. Xena and Gabrielle, in a nearby town, defeats three thugs who try to take advantage of the chaos caused by the earthquakes to do some looting. Hercules meets the Earth Titan Porphyrion as he emerges from the ground. Porphyrion tells Hercules to let him pass as his fight is with the gods on Mount Olympus. Hercules lets him past as long as he promises to leave the mortal world alone and take his fight to the gods as Hercules is not defending them. The Water Titan Tethys arises from the water as the Fire Titan Mnemosyne emerges from the volcano and the fat Wind Titan Crius materializes from a tornado right in front of Xena and Gabrielle. The Titans plan their revenge on the gods.

Zeus calls Artemis, Aphrodite, and Ares together to fight the Titans and they hope Hercules will help them. Xena and Gabrielle are helping wounded people following all the earthquakes, and Artemis decides to get Xena's help and transforms Gabrielle into a bird. Xena flies on Gabrielle to the gods' home while Hercules climbs up. When Xena accuses Ares for what he did to Gabrielle, Artemis tells Xena the truth about her actions and offers a deal: Help fight the Titans, and she'll revert Gabrielle back to normal.

Hercules rescues Alcmene after she fell out of the dollhouse and was returned to normal size and then departs, still refusing to help the gods against the Titans. Hera transforms Ares, Aphrodite, Artemis and Zeus into a goat, a cow, a rabbit, and a mouse, respectively after they are forced to flee Olympus. The others are dismayed that Hercules did not help the gods, which leaves Alcmene deeply upset with Hercules over his insensitive actions. When Xena and Ioalus arrive, she confronts Artemis and learns that she cannot turn Gabrielle or herself back due to the loss of the Gods' powers. Hercules finds out that Alcmene was sick and Zeus offered her immortality with him on Mount Olympus. Hercules is still angry at Zeus for abducting Alcmene in the first place, but begins to soften as he realizes his error in letting his anger cloud his judgement and not asking why Zeus took Alcmene in the first place, along with refusing to help protect Olympus from the Titans.

Hera scolds the Titans for wrecking Mount Olympus when they discuss the defeat of the gods. However, behind Hera's back, when Tethys voices her contempt about her, Porphyrion assures her that Hera won't be giving them orders much longer. On Earth, Xena and Hercules reconcile and agree to help the gods get their home and Cronus Stone back. Hearing Xena's war cry as she, Hercules, and Iolaus head to Olympus on Gabrielle, Hera uses the Cronus Stone to strengthen the Titans, but she fails to force her will on the Titans. The Titans strip the stone away from Hera and shrink her into the dollhouse. The heroes ride Gabrielle to the mountain and fight the Titans. Hercules gets the Cronus Stone and tears it apart, which causes the Underworld caverns to open. Hercules and Xena flip Crius into the lava and Iolaus gets Tethys and Mnemosyne to collide and dissolve into the fiery pits. Porphyrion grabs Hercules, but is pulled into the air by Gabrielle. Gabrielle drops the Titan into the cavern, but though Porphyrion tries to drag them with him, Hercules stops him, but nearly falls to his death. However, Gabrielle saves Hercules, and drops him off on the gods' mountain in time to close the stone, locking the Titans in their prison of lava. With the Titans imprisoned in Tartarus again, Hera's magic on the other gods is broken, and Zeus, Aphrodite, Artemis, and Ares are returned to their human forms. Zeus has a chance to gloat at his queen as she voices her annoyance over her defeat while still doll-sized.

Zeus and Alcmene go back to Olympus and Zeus welcomes Hercules to visit. Artemis turns Gabrielle back to her original form. Hercules heads off with Iolaus, Gabrielle, and Xena to Corinth to return a bag of gold and seek another adventure.

Voice cast

Production
The film was a joint production between Renaissance Pictures and Universal Cartoon Studios. Lynne Naylor, who worked at Filmation, Hanna-Barbera, Marvel, Spumco, and Warner Bros. was hired to direct the film. The script was written by John P. Loy, who wrote numerous scripts for animated television series such as Porchlight Entertainment's Adventures from the Book of Virtues and Warner Bros.' Pinky and the Brain before entering a multi-year deal with Universal Cartoon Studios to write, develop and produce animated projects. Originally slated for a mid-October release, the film was pushed back to January. "We want the finished product to be of the finest quality," said Louis Feola, President of Universal Home Video. "As often happens with an animated feature, more time was needed to complete the film."

While production continued on the film, a Hercules and Xena road tour was scheduled around the U.S., featuring a traveling exhibit of memorabilia from the live-action shows, previews of the upcoming Nintendo 64 game, and an inside look at the production of the animated movie

The film features three songs, "Across the Sea of Time", "Titan's Song", and "Xena's Song", written by Michele Brourman and Amanda McBroom. Tom McGrath served as a domestic key animator in the film, while Chris Mitchell co-directed the animation overseas at Koko Enterprises in Seoul, South Korea.

Release and reception

Release
In North America, Universal Studios Home Video released the movie on VHS in the United States and Canada on January 6, 1998. The movie was also released on DVD on February 28, that same year, and included in the DVD box set "Hercules Action Pack" along with "The Xena Trilogy", "Young Hercules (film)" and "Hercules and the Amazon Women & Lost Kingdom". The original VHS release featured a trailer for the then-upcoming Young Hercules film. In the United States, it was priced at $19.98 or less, and packed with mail-in rebate offers from Universal Studios Home Video and Tropicana Products; cross-promotions with Sound Source Interactive and Topps Comics; and a free "Hercules and Xena" warrior wear bracelet, a $6.99 value.

Reception
Upon release, the movie received a mixed reception from critics. Peter Cook writing for SF Gate said "Though steeped in pop-style Greek myth, the video has a '90s attitude. Aphrodite rides what looks like a snowboard and laces her speech with ditzy Valley-Girl phrases."

Randy Myers Knight-Ridder for The Spokesman gave another positive review saying "All of the mayhem and god blustering is executed with a light, calculated touch. While it can't compare to the two syndicated series, Universal's "The Animated Movie" is an entertaining bit of fluff for young fans. And it's certainly better than the lumbering, gaudy "Hercules" film that Disney tried to foist off on children last summer."

Marc Bernardin writing for EW gave the film a D rating on a scale of A–F. Referring to the limited animation, he wrote "It's all suitably legendary, but why must the animated movie hark back to Hanna-Barbera in the paint-by-numbers Speed Buggy years? Even its greatest strength—the assured voice work of Kevin Sorbo and Lucy Lawless, reprising their TV roles—only reminds us of what's unforgivable about Olympus: It's not nearly as vivid a cartoon as the live-action series."

Legacy
Though featuring the same major characters and the (mostly) same cast, this movie is generally not considered canonical to Hercules: The Legendary Journeys and Xena: Warrior Princess. Some elements, however, later made their way into the live-action series, including:
Mnemosyne's appearance in "Let There Be Light" is consistent with her appearance here.
 The Kronos stone, mentioned in earlier productions as simply a time-travel device, is confirmed in "The Prize" and later "Love, Amazon Style" to give gods "power greater than Zeus." This matches the ability of the stone as seen in this film.
 A clip of this movie was featured in "Yes, Virginia, There is a Hercules."
 Zeus' appearance in the film is based on Anthony Quinn's portrayal in the Universal Action Pack films.
 Though not identified as such, a character bearing a strong resemblance to Salmoneus makes a brief appearance.
 Xena references the events of "The Reckoning".
 Surprisingly, Hera appears in her human form. When the film was produced, Hera had yet to appear "in the flesh" on the series. She would, however, finally do so a few months after the film was released.

Inspiration 
The story is inspired by the Gigantomachy, a war the Olympians fought with a race of beings called the Gigantes, or giants, whom Gaia created to get revenge on the Olympians for killing the Titans. Porphyrion was the leader of the giants, who could only be killed by gods and demigods working together – Heracles, unsurprisingly, was selected as the gods' primary champion. The original story featured many more than just five Olympians, with Athena and Hermes playing major roles – the Fates even took part, beating some of the giants with bronze clubs. Unlike what’s seen in the movie, Hera was not on the Giants' side but was actually the field commander of the Olympians, as Zeus' thunderbolts were needed as heavy artillery.

See also
List of animated feature-length films

References

External links

1990s American animated films
1990s fantasy adventure films
1998 animated films
1998 direct-to-video films
1998 films
American action adventure films
American children's animated adventure films
American children's animated fantasy films
American fantasy adventure films
Animated duos
Animated films based on classical mythology
American sword and sorcery films
Fictional duos
Films about Heracles
Films directed by Lynne Naylor
Films produced by Lynne Naylor
Films set in ancient Greece
Hercules: The Legendary Journeys
Universal Animation Studios animated films
Universal Pictures direct-to-video animated films
Universal Pictures direct-to-video films
Xena: Warrior Princess
1990s English-language films